Jesse Huta Galung was the defending champion but lost to David Goffin in the semifinals. Goffin went on to win the tournament, beating Andreas Beck 6–3, 6–2

Seeds

  Robin Haase (second round)
  Diego Sebastián Schwartzman (second round)
  Thomaz Bellucci (second round)
  Aleksandr Nedovyesov (quarterfinals)
  David Goffin (champion)
  Pierre-Hugues Herbert (second round)
  Andreas Beck (final)
  João Souza (semifinals)

Draw

Finals

Top half

Bottom half

References
 Main Draw
 Qualifying Draw

Sport 1 Open - Singles
2014 Singles